The Mighty is an epithet for:

People:
Sigurd Eysteinsson (ruled c. 875–892), Earl of Orkney
Stephen Uroš IV Dušan of Serbia (c. 1308–1355), King of Serbia and Emperor of the Serbs and Greeks
Thorfinn the Mighty (1009?–c. 1064?), Earl of Orkney

Fictional characters:
Gorzo the Mighty, writer for The Onion
Morgyn the Mighty, a comic strip character
Tharg the Mighty, recurring character in science fiction comic 2000 AD

Lists of people by epithet